Lisa Donovan (born June 11, 1980) is an American former YouTuber. She is a founder of Zappin Productions, a production company that specialized in viral videos, as well as the founder and CEO of The Pattern, an astrology-based personality app.

Donovan began her career as one of YouTube's earliest content creators and was subsequently one of the co-founders of Maker Studios, a YouTube video network which was purchased in 2015 by The Walt Disney Company for $675M. The network was absorbed by Disney in 2017 to become Disney Digital Network. The network provided production and marketing services for over 1,000 YouTube channels.

Early life 
Donovan grew up in Scarsdale, New York. She was a student at the University of Colorado at Boulder before moving to Los Angeles, California.

Career

YouTube 
Donovan made her first YouTube channel in September 2005 and uploaded her first video, "Introducing LisaNova," a reel of facial clips in black-and-white accompanied by the Charles Aznavour song Non, je n'ai rien oublié, to YouTube on June 7, 2006. She has parodied a number of celebrities and public figures; her impersonation of Sarah Palin was praised in Wired as "ruthlessly hilarious", and in 2008 Ralph Nader made a guest appearance in one of the skits. In a Forbes magazine article, YouTube founder Chad Hurley highlighted Donovan's success as an example of the changing paradigm of entertainment. Donovan is also a co-creator of the popular YouTube channel 'The Game Station', which led to her co-founding the YouTube network Maker Studios.

Mainstream success 
Donovan was one of the first YouTube content creators to cross over to mainstream Hollywood when she was cast on MADtv in 2006. She debuted in a spoof of The Ellen DeGeneres Show, where she played Salma Hayek, the producer of the ABC comedy Ugly Betty, and Rosie O'Donnell. The episode aired on February 17, 2007. After signing a contract and only appearing in four episodes of MADtv, she left the following season.

In 2010, she was given a role in Cosmopolitan'''s Fun & Fearless campaign for females.

In 2011, she was honored as Pioneer in New Media at the third annual Burbank International Film Festival alongside fellow honorees Bill Plympton, Mark Kirkland, Fred Willard, Al Jean, and Roger Corman.

In 2015, she played the role of the flight attendant in Jeremy Garelick's The Wedding Ringer.

 Maker Studios 
Donovan co-founded and served as a board member for Maker Studios, a next-generation talent-focused technology & media company. Maker Studios was sold to The Walt Disney Company in 2014.

 The Pattern 

Donovan is the founder and CEO of The Pattern, an astrology-based personality app. Before it officially launched it had 30,000 users by word of mouth. By 2021, the app had over 15 million profiles. The Pattern is initially free, but with paid features. The app uses the time, date and place of birth to make a "pattern", which is like a user's manual to their life that The Sunday Times'' described as "Myers-Briggs meets Brené Brown".

Donovan stated that her life experiences around the time of the Maker Studios acquisition by Disney inspired her to build The Pattern, which she initially self-funded with a portion of her earnings from the sale. In 2021, Donovan announced that The Pattern intends to launch a dating product called Connect.

See also 
 List of YouTube personalities

References

External links 

LisaNova at YouTube

1980 births
Living people
American businesspeople
American people of Guernsey descent
University of Colorado alumni
Maker Studios people
American YouTubers
Scarsdale High School alumni
American sketch comedians
American web series actresses
21st-century American actresses
American businesspeople in the online media industry
YouTube channels launched in 2005
YouTube channels launched in 2006
21st-century American comedians
Cultural depictions of Sarah Palin